David Blackwell (born May 4, 1971) is an American football coach who was most recently the defensive coordinator at Louisiana Tech University. He was previously the defensive coordinator at Old Dominion University and East Carolina University, serving as the interim head coach for the latter in 2018 after the termination of Scottie Montgomery.
As

Coaching career
Blackwell started his coaching career at East Carolina as a student assistant after he suffered a neck-injury while playing offensive line for the Pirates. He also had coaching stints at Illinois State and Pittsburgh before joining the coaching staff at Clemson as the team's linebackers coach and later added recruiting coordinator duties a couple of months later after the departure of Rick Stockstill. He left after the 2008 season to join the coaching staff at South Florida as the Bulls linebackers coach and co-defensive coordinator. After being out of football for two seasons, Blackwell returned to college football as the defensive coordinator for Fordham from 2012 to 2013 before joining the Jacksonville State coaching staff in 2014 as a co-defensive coordinator and the inside linebackers coach.

East Carolina (second stint)
After finding success at Jacksonville State, Blackwell was hired to be the defensive coordinator at his alma mater East Carolina for the 2018 season. He served as the interim head coach for the Pirates game against NC State after head coach Scottie Montgomery was fired on November 29, 2018.

Old Dominion
Blackwell was named the defensive coordinator at Old Dominion in 2019,  In his lone season at Old Dominion, he guided the Monarchs to the top-50 defense in terms of yards allowed after ranking 118th the year before. Despite the drastic improvement of the defense, the Monarchs only won 1 game which led to Blackwell being terminated along with head coach Bobby Wilder.

Louisiana Tech
Blackwell was named the defensive coordinator at Louisiana Tech in January 2020.

Head coaching record

Notes

Reference

External links
 Louisiana Tech profile
 East Carolina profile
 Jacksonville State profile
 South Florida profile

1971 births
Living people
American football offensive linemen
Clemson Tigers football coaches
East Carolina Pirates football coaches
East Carolina Pirates football players
Fordham Rams football coaches
Illinois State Redbirds football coaches
Jacksonville State Gamecocks football coaches
Louisiana Tech Bulldogs football coaches
Old Dominion Monarchs football coaches
Pittsburgh Panthers football coaches
South Florida Bulls football coaches
Sportspeople from Greenville, South Carolina